Tritonidoxa is a genus of sea slugs, specifically dendronotid nudibranchs. It is a marine gastropod mollusc in the family Tritoniidae.

Species
A monotypic genus, the only species is Tritonidoxa capensis.
Species brought into synonymy
 Tritonidoxa wellsi (Er. Marcus, 1961); synonym of Tritonicula wellsi (Er. Marcus, 1961)

Distribution
Tritonidoxa capensis was found in South Africa.

References

Tritoniidae
Monotypic gastropod genera